Sarfarosh is a 1999 Indian action drama film written, produced and directed by John Matthew Matthan and starring Aamir Khan, Naseeruddin Shah, Sonali Bendre and Mukesh Rishi. John started working on Sarfarosh in 1992. Seven years were spent on the research, pre-production and production till it finally released in 1999. The film deals with an Indian police officer's quest to stop cross-border terrorism.

The film was released just before the Kargil conflict when tensions between India and Pakistan were high. On release, the film was both, critically and commercially, successful. The movie received praise, for the cast performances, especially Khan, Shah and Rishi. Its technical aspects, music and story were also praised. The film won the National Film Award for Best Popular Film Providing Wholesome Entertainment, the Filmfare Critics Award for Best Film, and was screened at the International Film Festival of India. The film was remade in Kannada as Sathyameva Jayathe with Devaraj and in Telugu as Astram (2006) with Vishnu Manchu and Anushka Shetty.

Plot 
Arms trafficking is taking place in India. Bala Thakur, a gun handler, provides the arms to Veeran, a brigand. Veeran and his gang attack a wedding bus, gunning down every person in it. The government appoints a Special Action Team in Mumbai to trace the attack.

ACP Ajay Singh Rathore (Aamir Khan), a resident of Mumbai, attends a concert by famed ghazal singer, the elderly Gulfam Hassan (Naseeruddin Shah), a Muhajir. Gulfam is Indian by birth but had to move to Pakistan as a child during the partition; deeply scarred by the experience, he is happy that the government allows him to live in his palatial residence whenever he comes to India. Gulfam finds a huge fan in Ajay, who used to attend his programs as a child, and the two bond. Ajay also reunites with Seema (Sonali Bendre), whom he had a crush on when they were studying in Delhi. The duo falls in love.

Inspector Saleem (Mukesh Rishi), an honest policeman, is taken off the team when notorious gangster Sultan (Pradeep Rawat) escapes his clutches. He is reprimanded for this failure and for causing the death of three officers in the attempt. Despite Saleem doing his duty sincerely, his senior officers look down upon him because he is a Muslim. When Ajay, who is younger, inexperienced and was mentored by Saleem himself before assuming charge, is told to head the team, Saleem is annoyed and refuses to take part in the investigation. Ajay's past is revealed: his father was going to testify against a terrorist, and in an attempt to stop them, Ajay's elder brother was killed. His father was kidnapped, and by the time the terrorists spared him, the man had lost his voice. This motivated Ajay to join the police force.

Gulfam is revealed to be working for the Pakistani intelligence, which is attempting to indulge in a proxy war with India. Since Gulfam likes Ajay, he sees to it that nothing happens to him. Saleem finds the location of Bala Thakur and Sultan and gives the information to Ajay, who convinces him to join the team again. An encounter with the criminals results in the death of Bala Thakur while Ajay is injured. Though Sultan escapes, the operation is a success as the team is able to intercept a consignment of lethal arms meant for terrorist Veeran. Sultan is assassinated on Gulfam's orders because of his failure.

Ajay has an epiphany which leads the team to Bahid in Rajasthan. There, Ajay meets Gulfam, who is temporarily staying in his ancestral manor. Gulfam's attempts to derail the investigation, even ordering an assault on Ajay, are of no avail. The repeated failures displease the Pakistani Intelligence, which dispatch Major Aslam Baig to take care of the business.

The team prepares for a final assault on the gun-running operation and land at Gulfam's mansion. Ajay feels betrayed when he learns of Gulfam's betrayal, but is aware of the lack of evidence to indict him for his crimes. He tricks Gulfam into killing Baig and arrests him for it. Gulfam reveals that he did what he did because of how his experiences during the partition hurt him. Ajay makes him realise that his actions are not benefiting any people of any religion, and Gulfam, unable to stand the humiliation and guilt, commits suicide. His suicide is hushed up, and the team returns to Mumbai to much accolades for busting the terrorist racket. Saleem is tipped on the whereabouts of Veeran, and Ajay embarks on another investigation with his team.

Cast 

 Aamir Khan as ACP Ajay Kumar Singh Rathod: Gulfam's friend-enemy and Seema's boyfriend
 Naseeruddin Shah as Gulfam Hassan, a Pakistani singer
 Sonali Bendre as Seema Nagrath: Ajay's girlfriend
 Vallabh Vyas as Major Aslam Baig
 Dinesh Kaushik as Roshan Nagrath, Seema's brother
 Mukesh Rishi as Inspector Saleem Ahmed
 Pradeep Rawat as Sultan Deep
 Govind Namdev as Veeran
 Akhilendra Mishra as Rambandhu Gupta / Mirchi Seth
 Makrand Deshpande as Shiva
 Rajesh Joshi as Bala Thakur
 Salim Shah as Inspector Rajan Yadav
 Manoj Joshi as SI Bajju
 Ramesh Goyal as Hawaldar Rakesh Kadam
 Smita Jaykar as Mrs. Rathod, Ajay's mother
 Akash Khurana as Mr. Rathod, Ajay's father
 Ahmed Khan as Haji Seth
 Nawazuddin Siddiqui as the goon in police custody which gives information after torture
 Surekha Sikri as Mrs. Deep, Sultan's mother
 Upasana Singh as Mala Sharma
 Ashok Lokhande as Chandrapur Hawaldar
 Dinesh Phadnis as a SI Crime Branch
 Sunil Shende as Deputy Commissioner of Police
 Sukanya Kulkarni as Ajay's Bhabhi
 Ali Khan as Captain Shafi

Music 

The film's music was composed by Jatin–Lalit. Lyrics are penned by Israr Ansari, Nida Fazli, Sameer, and Indeevar. Hosh Walon ko khabar kya was penned by Nida Fazli according to Lalit Pandit. Jatin Pandit on his Youtube channel has specified how the ghazal was originally composed for Bhupinder Singh and Jatin-Lalit recorded Bhupinder's version of the ghazal but on the insistence of the film's administrators and their request for a more popular ghazal singer; they approached Jagjit Singh to sing this ghazal. Jatin also noted that he made it a point to create a new tune for the Jagjit Singh's version as to honor the work put in by Bhupinder earlier.

Reception

Critical response 
Upon theatrical release, Sarfarosh received critical acclaim from film critics. Naseeruddin Shah was especially praised for his role of a Muhajir. The reviewer for Filmfare rated the film four stars out of five and wrote, "What makes this film so exceptional is its carefully thought out characterization and brilliant performances. Although this is his first film, director John Mathew Matthan draws perfectly crafted outputs from his entire cast. Aamir brings the role of A.C.P. Rathod to a never-before-seen dimension of reality." He further added, "Sarfarosh succeeds in connecting with the audiences, as it manages to transcend its medium and do a great deal more than just entertain."

Suparn Verma of Rediff.com felt that the film "manages to marry serious cinema with the commercial variety" and wrote that the "script has this no-nonsense look to it, clearly and succinctly establishing the protagonist's past ..." In addition to commending the acting performances of Naseeruddin Shah, Aamir Khan and Sonali Bendre, he lauded the departments of direction, music, choreography, and called the camerawork "good in parts but lack[ing] technical finesse".

Accolades

Notes

References

External links 
 
 
 
 

1999 films
1990s spy thriller films
Indian spy thriller films
Indian political thriller films
Films shot in Rajasthan
Films about terrorism in India
1999 action thriller films
Films scored by Jatin–Lalit
1990s Hindi-language films
Indian action thriller films
Politics of Jammu and Kashmir
Fictional portrayals of the Maharashtra Police
India–Pakistan relations in popular culture
Hindi films remade in other languages
Intelligence Bureau (India) in fiction
Best Popular Film Providing Wholesome Entertainment National Film Award winners
Films about the Research and Analysis Wing
Films scored by Sanjoy Chowdhury
1990s political thriller films